This is a list of notable Nigerian film directors.

 Dagogo Diminas
 Toyin Abraham
 Adekunle Adejuyigbe
 Uyoyou Adia
 Yewande Adekoya
 Dolapo 'LowlaDee' Adeleke
 Wale Adenuga
 Funsho Adeolu
 Sikiru Adesina
 Kemi Adetiba
 Judith Audu 
 Newton Aduaka
 Kunle Afolayan
 Toka Mcbaror
 Afro Candy
 Eric Aghimien
 Niji Akanni
 Mahmood Ali-Balogun
 Genevieve Nnaji
 Niyi Akinmolayan
 Pascal Amanfo
 Fred Amata
 Jeta Amata
 Bolaji Amusan
 Chet Anekwe
 Frank Rajah Arase
 Ejike Asiegbu
 Pascal Atuma
 Ishaya Bako
 Ola Balogun
 Gloria Bamiloye
 Biyi Bandele
 Michelle Bello
 Teco Benson
 JJ Bunny
 Andy Chukwu
 Sam Dede
 Nonso Diobi
 Andrew Dosunmu
 Emamode Edosio
 Chico Ejiro
 Prince Eke
 Desmond Elliot
 Obi Emelonye
 Rick Famuyiwa
 Tam Fiofori
 Shan George
 Kenneth Gyang
 Lancelot Oduwa Imasuen
 Charles Uwagbai
 Chinedum Iregbu
 Dickson Iroegbu
 Uche Jombo
 Tunde Kelani
 Mak 'Kusare
 Akin Lewis
 Ndave David Njoku
 Charles Novia
 Chike Nwoffiah
 Lonzo Nzekwe
 C. J. Obasi
 Saint Obi
 Femi Odugbemi
 Tade Ogidan
 Kingsley Ogoro
 Akin Ogungbe
 Wole Oguntokun
 Izu Ojukwu
 Stephanie Okereke Linus
 Mildred Okwo
 Mayowa Oluyeba
 Akin Omotoso
 Ikechukwu Onyeka
 Zack Orji
 Tope Oshin Ogun
 Olatunde Osunsanmi
 Clarence Peters
 Robert O. Peters
 Gbenga Salu
 Zina Saro-Wiwa
 Joke Silva
 Bob-Manuel Udokwu
 Uzee Usman
 Rogers Ofime

References

Film directors